Kolar Venkatesh Iyer, known as K. V. Iyer (1897-1980) was a gymnast, bodybuilder, proponent of Indian  physical culture, and author of books including the 1930 Muscle Cult: A Pro-Em for My System. He contributed to the development of modern yoga as a system of exercise.

He was "possibly the most high-profile Indian advocate of physical culture in the first half of the twentieth century."

Life

Kolar Venkatesh Iyer was born in the village of Devarayasmudra in Kolar District, Karnataka. His mother died when he was ten, and he went to school in Mysore, reaching the Intermediate level. Soon after that he began developing his own system of bodybuilding. He was a gymnast, bodybuilder, energetic and well-known proponent of Indian physical culture, and a contributor, like other gymnastics teachers such as Krishnamacharya, to the development of modern yoga. He consciously combined hatha yoga with bodybuilding in his Bangalore gymnasium, around 1930. He helped, too, to present the sequence of yoga asanas called Surya Namaskar, the Salute to the Sun, as a practical, modern, stretching exercise rather than as something spiritual. He toured India doing lecture-demonstrations, accompanied by the yoga guru Seetharaman Sundaram.

This helped to change the perception of yoga from a magical technique intended for the medieval and magical transformation of the body into something immortal, by conquering the five elements, to a view of the body from the point of view of looking good and being physically fit.

His first gymnasium was established in the Sultan's palace in Bangalore in 1922. He moved several times, finally in 1940 setting up the "famous" Vyayamsala on J. C. Road, Bangalore. He became "the most important Indian physical culture instructor of the time", attempting "to blend Yoga, Hindu mysticism, and occidental physical culture into something uniquely his own".

Iyer served also as physician to the Maharajah of Mysore. As well as promoting gymnastics, he vigorously promoted himself, appearing in magazines such as Health and Strength and The Superman, and describing himself as "India's most perfectly developed man" with "a body which Gods covet".

K. V. Iyer's close friends included T. P. Kailasam and V. Seetharamaiah. The humorous playwright T. P. Kailasam, hearing from Iyer that he had not read anything by Oscar Wilde, replied "Oh my! You are only into body-building, what about your brain? You should prove to the world that a well-built body can harbour a creative mind too." The effect was to encourage Iyer to become a novelist, publishing Roopadarshi, Shantala, Leena, Mrischakitika, Samudyata, Ekalavya, and Sayyada Mane in the Kannada language.

Works

See also

 Seetharaman Sundaram - Iyer's assistant and yoga specialist on his lecture/demonstration tours

References

Sources 

 
 
 

1897 births
1980 deaths
Indian bodybuilders
Modern yoga pioneers
People associated with physical culture